PP-131 Nankana Sahib-I is a Constituency of Provincial Assembly of Punjab.

General elections 2013

General elections were held on 11 May 2013.
Ch, Tariq Mehmood Bajwa from Hanjli village Sangla Hill, independent candidate with support of PMLN won by 36,444 votes and became MPA and later he joins PMLN.

General elections 2008
Tariq Mehood Bajwa From PMLN was elected as MPA

See also
 PP-130 Jhang-VII
 PP-132 Nankana Sahib-II

References

External links
 Election commission Pakistan's official website
 Awazoday.com check result
 Official Website of Government of Punjab

Constituencies of Punjab, Pakistan